Jean-Luc Eric Bakame Ndayishimiye (born 25 May 1991) is a Rwanda international footballer who plays as a goalkeeper. As of February 2010, he plays for APR FC and has won six caps for his country. Jean Luc signed for Rayons Sport since 2013 and he signed recently an extension of contract that will make him stay in Rayon for another 2 years.

External links

1991 births
Living people
Association football goalkeepers
Rwandan footballers
Rwanda international footballers
APR F.C. players
Rayon Sports F.C. players
People from Kigali
ATRACO F.C. players
2011 African Nations Championship players
Rwanda A' international footballers
2016 African Nations Championship players
2018 African Nations Championship players
2020 African Nations Championship players